Bastilla arcuata is a moth of the family Noctuidae first described by Frederic Moore in 1877. It is found from the Oriental region of India, Sri Lanka, Myanmar to Sundaland, Seram and New Guinea.

Description
Its wingspan is about 48–54 mm. Antemedial line of the forewings sinuous. A curved medial line found beyond the violaceous band meeting the angled postmedial line at costa and inner margin. The outer edge of the oblique apical streak excised.

Larva has brown head with whitish yellow spots. The first two pairs of abdominal prolegs are rudimentary. There is an almost circular black spot found on the frons. Body generally brown with dark spots. Setae on yellow chalazae, are ringed with black. There are two tubercles are salmon pink. The larvae feed on Glochidion and Phyllanthus species. Pupa with white efflorescence.

References

Bastilla (moth)
Moths of Asia
Moths of Japan